The Association of Secondary Teachers, Ireland (ASTI) is a trade union for secondary school teachers in Ireland. It is a member of the Irish Congress of Trade Unions. The union represents 18,500 teachers in schools attended by 80% of all second-level students.

Purpose
The ASTI represents teachers on educational issues and working conditions.
The objects and aims of the ASTI are:
 to promote second-level education
 to unite and organise all second-level teachers
 to promote and protect teachers' interests
 to maintain and improve teachers' conditions of employment

The ASTI acts as a professional advocate for second level teachers, offers legal protection to its members, campaigns for improved working conditions and ensures continuing professional development for teachers providing research facility for teachers where necessary. The association will also provide a team of experienced industrial relations negotiators to assist teachers facing difficulties at school. The ASTI set up a Credit Union in 1984.

History
The ASTI began on 17 March 1909,  at a meeting called by teachers of St Colman's College, Fermoy. There had been an Irish National Teachers Organisation (INTO) since 1868 which had been successful in gaining better working conditions and pay for their members. At the time, conditions for secondary teachers were very poor with men earning about £80 a year and women a little over half that. One of the aims of the association was to raise the status of teachers in the community.

The main force behind the formation of the union was Patrick Kennedy, a teacher at St Colman's. Founding members included such national figures as Easter Rising leader Thomas MacDonagh, whose godfather was Kennedy's father and who was a close friend, and the future Taoiseach and President of Ireland, Éamon de Valera.

In 1911 the decision was taken to establish a women's section within the ASTI, which was named the Women Teachers' Association (WTA). The role and social acceptance of female teachers changed dramatically from a place where female secondary teachers had to retire upon marriage to a place where women became president of the union.

The history of the union is documented in the book Unlikely Radicals. The organisation struggled with the development of education, the role of the Catholic church, and the changes in state which occurred while trying to include as much of the population as possible in education.

General Secretary
The General Secretary represents the interests of the members of the union on topics such as their salary, conditions of employment and education at a national and international level. The General Secretary manages the daily business of the ASTI and ensures that ASTI policy is appropriately carried out. This post is not elected annually but rather is appointed as a full-time position.

Kieran Mulvey was the General secretary of the ASTI from 1983 until he was replaced by Charlie Lennon in 1991. On Lennon's retirement in 2004 John White became acting General Secretary of the ASTI and was appointed in 2005. Pat King replaced White in September 2010.
Kieran Christie was General Secretary as of 1 January 2016

President
The president of the union is elected at the annual convention and takes office on 1 August of that year. Unlike the General Secretary the President is always a teacher and takes a leave of absence from their teaching role for the duration of their term.

See also

 Education in the Republic of Ireland

References

Education International
Education trade unions
Trade unions established in 1909
Education in Ireland
Trade unions in the Republic of Ireland
Organisations based in Dublin (city)
All-Ireland organisations
1909 establishments in Ireland
Seanad nominating bodies